Mikhail Ivanovich Musatov (23 August 1950 – 13 December 2022) was a Russian politician who was a deputy of the State Duma from 1995. He was a member of the Liberal Democratic Party of Russia, and was Deputy Chairman of the State Duma's Committee on Defense.  Prior to his election to the State Duma, Musatov was LDPR chairman for Moscow.  He held doctorates in the fields of politics and law. His son, Ivan Musatov, is also a deputy of the State Duma.

Musatov died on 13 December 2022, at the age of 72.

References

1950 births
2022 deaths
Liberal Democratic Party of Russia politicians
Second convocation members of the State Duma (Russian Federation)
Third convocation members of the State Duma (Russian Federation)
Fourth convocation members of the State Duma (Russian Federation)
Fifth convocation members of the State Duma (Russian Federation)
Recipients of the Order "For Service to the Homeland in the Armed Forces of the USSR", 3rd class
People from Gegharkunik Province